Novak Djokovic defeated Marin Čilić in the final, 6–3, 6–4 to win the singles tennis title at the 2022 Tel Aviv Open. Djokovic did not drop a set en route to his 89th ATP Tour-level singles title.

This was the first edition of an ATP Tour event in Tel Aviv since 1996.

Seeds
The top four seeds received a bye into the second round.

Draw

Finals

Top half

Bottom half

Qualifying

Seeds

Qualifiers

Lucky loser

Qualifying draw

First qualifier

Second qualifier

Third qualifier

Fourth qualifier

References

External links 
Main draw
Qualifying draw

Tel Aviv Open - Singles
2022 Singles